Carl Schurz Forkum (November 23, 1882 – March 19, 1934) was an American football and baseball player and coach. He served as the 11th head football coach at West Virginia University and he held that position for two seasons, from 1905 to 1906.  His coaching record at West Virginia was 13–6.

Forkum died in 1934 of "complications of diseases" after a month in a hospital. At the time of his death he worked for a steel company and served on the local school board. He was buried in Franklin Cemetery in Franklin, Pennsylvania.

Head coaching record

Football

References

External links
 
 

1882 births
1934 deaths
Penn State Nittany Lions baseball players
Penn State Nittany Lions football players
Sharon Steels players
Washington & Jefferson Presidents football players
West Virginia Mountaineers baseball coaches
West Virginia Mountaineers football coaches
People from Clarion County, Pennsylvania